Yangnyer Gewog (Dzongkha: ཡངས་ཉེར་) is a gewog (village block) of Trashigang District, Bhutan.

References

Gewogs of Bhutan
Trashigang District